4 Bruthas & a Bass is the second studio album by American R&B group Solo, released September 22, 1998. Like the group's previous album, this album was also released on Jimmy Jam and Terry Lewis' record label, Perspective Records; however, Jam and Lewis did not produce the album and production was instead handled by Henley "Jr." Regisford. The album peaked at #123 on the Billboard 200; and its only single was "Touch Me", which peaked at #59 on the Billboard Hot 100.

Track listing

Chart positions

Notes

References

External links
 
 

1998 albums
Perspective Records albums
Solo (American band) albums